Gumrah is a 1993 Indian Hindi-language  action crime drama film directed by Mahesh Bhatt and written jointly  by Sujit Sen and Robin Bhatt. It stars Sridevi, Sanjay Dutt, Anupam Kher, and Rahul Roy. In the film, Roshni (Sridevi), an aspiring singer, is assisted by Rahul Malhotra (Roy) in flourishing her career and they fall in love. However, on a trip to Hong Kong, she is abandoned by him and later arrested by the police for supposed involvement in trafficking cocaine. 

Gumrah was loosely based on the Australian miniseries Bangkok Hilton, and was produced by Yash Johar under the Dharma Productions banner. Pravin Bhatt acted as the film's cinematographer, while Sanjay Sankla handled the editing. The duo Laxmikant–Pyarelal composed the film's music, with lyrics penned by Anand Bakshi.  

Upon release, the film was critically well received, with major appreciation drawn towards Sridevi's performance, which is considered one of her career best and subsequently earned her a nomination for Best Actress at the 39th Filmfare Awards. The film was also a commercial success grossing  worldwide against its  budget. becoming the seventh highest-grossing film of 1993.

Plot
Roshni (Sridevi) is the only child of Sharda Chadda (Reema Lagoo). Her father, Prakash Chadda (Anupam Kher), left before she was born, and she has no knowledge of where he went. After her mother learns she has a fatal illness, she asks her family friend to take Roshni to Mumbai, so that she learns to live without her and be independent. Roshni is introduced to Rahul Malhotra (Rahul Roy), and they share a mutual attraction. When he learns that she is an aspiring singer, he assists in her career, so she becomes popular. She has a devoted fan named Jagannath, alias Jaggu (Sanjay Dutt), who is a petty thief. He is in love with her, but she rejects him. Roshni's mother reveals on her deathbed that Roshni's father is alive and had been forced to abandon his family over a government level criminal accusations exacerbated by Roshni's grandmother's reluctance to allow him back home. She tells Roshni that that she is free to go find her father. During a trip, she and Rahul take to Hong Kong to look for her father, Roshni is arrested for trafficking cocaine, and Rahul disappears. Jaggu brings an attorney, but she is quickly found guilty and sentenced to death, remanded to a prison where inmates are kept barefoot and in squalid conditions. Jaggu visits the prison and runs afoul of two guards, themselves lovers, who beat him in front of Roshni. The attorney works to help them escape. A fight ensues between Roshni and the female guard, in which the latter is killed. The warden intervenes and is killed by Jaggu, they escape and return to India. At the airport, Prakash is questioned by the police, and Roshni learns that he is her father, and that he had fled the country years earlier when he had been wrongfully accused of treason. Later at Rahul's house, Rahul admits that he had been dealing with drugs that resulted in Roshni's arrest. She slaps him for deceiving her and gets him arrested. With Prakash's blessings, Roshni and Jaggu get married.

Cast
Sanjay Dutt as Jagan Nath "Jaggu"
Sridevi as Roshni Chadha
Anupam Kher as Prakash Chadha, Roshni's father.
Rahul Roy as Rahul Malhotra
Soni Razdan as Angela
Reema Lagoo as Sharda Chadha, Roshni's mother.
Kunika as Female cop in Hong Kong
Tom Alter as Inspector Phillip
Sudesh Issar
Bob Christo as Male cop in Hong Kong
Anang Desai as Ahuja
Laxmikant Berde as Pakya
Kamini Kaushal as Sharda's mother
Avtaar Gill as Roshni's Uncle
Mushtaq Khan as Police Inspector
Mahesh Anand as  Tiger, Opposition Fighter in Hong Kong.

Production
During an episode of the reality show India's Next Superstars, Mahesh Bhatt shared that Sridevi shot for a sequence of the film in water despite having a high fever of 102 degrees. It was also reported that Reema Lagoo's role in the film was cut short only because Sridevi demanded for it; she felt that Lagoo's performance dominated over that of hers. Owing to this, Yash Johar promised to cast Lagoo in the role of the mother in all his subsequent films, which include Kuch Kuch Hota Hai and Kal Ho Na Ho.

Reception
The soundtrack for the film was the second successive hit (after Khalnayak) for the music director duo Laxmikant–Pyarelal. 
   When it screened in Nigeria, it is remarked that audiences loved and knew the film. "They cheered at tense points, thumping their seats and stamping their feet. At other points they mimicked dialogue and shouted out responses to the heroes and villains, the film was also well received at the Indian box office and was the seventh highest grossing Hindi film of 1993."

Soundtrack
Anand Bakshi wrote all songs.

External links

References

1993 films
1990s Hindi-language films
Films directed by Mahesh Bhatt
Films scored by Laxmikant–Pyarelal
Indian crime drama films
Films set in Hong Kong
Indian action thriller films
Indian thriller films